Jadranski Sport was a weekly sports magazine published in Split, then part of the Kingdom of Serbs, Croats and Slovenes. Published by the Split Olympic Sub-Committee, for the first nine issues it was published as an independent weekly, while after the tenth issue it was published as a weekly supplement to the Novo doba daily newspaper. The magazine's editor was Bogumir Doležal.

Footnotes

References 

Croatian-language magazines
Magazines established in 1920
Magazines disestablished in 1923
Mass media in Split, Croatia
Sport in Split, Croatia
Sports magazines